Canaries Decides was a Canary Island-based electoral alliance formed in 2015 by The Greens, Unity of the People and Republican Alternative. United Canarian Left was also a member of the alliance in the 2015 Canarian regional election, but contested the 2015 general election separately.

Member parties
United Canarian Left (ICU) (in the 2015 Canarian regional election)
The Greens (LV)
Unity of the People (UP)
Republican Alternative (ALTER)

References

Political parties in the Canary Islands
Political parties established in 2015
Defunct political party alliances in Spain